Tore på sporet is a long running talk show aired in Norway on NRK 1 in several seasons between 1996 and 2018. It is presented by former athlete and journalist Tore Strømøy.

A number of internationally famous people in the English speaking world appeared on the show including Canadian singer Shania Twain and American singer Lynn Anderson.  Such interviews were conducted in English.

Seasons

 1996
 1997
 2000
 2002
 2006
 2009
 2013
 2016
 2018

External links

Norwegian television talk shows
1996 Norwegian television series debuts
1990s Norwegian television series
2000s Norwegian television series
2010s Norwegian television series
NRK original programming
2013 Norwegian television series endings